United Nations Security Council Resolution 2059 relating to United Nations Supervision Mission in Syria was unanimously adopted on 20 July 2012.

See also 
List of United Nations Security Council Resolutions 2001 to 2100
List of United Nations resolutions concerning Syria

References

External links
Text of the Resolution at undocs.org

2012 United Nations Security Council resolutions
 2059
2012 in Syria
July 2012 events